Morunasaurus groi, known commonly as Gro's manticore, Dunn's spinytail iguana, or Dunn's spinytail lizard, is a species of lizard in the family Hoplocercidae. The species is endemic to northwestern South America and Panama.

Etymology
The specific name, groi, commemorates "Lord Gro", a character in the novel The Worm Ouroboros by E. R. Eddison.

Description
The tail of M. groi is covered with small spines. Males are reddish-brown with dark brown transverse bands across the back, reaching to the middle of the sides and then breaking up into small, irregular dark spots. Small white spots occur between the dark bands above the first longitudinal row of tubercles. The neck is red, with an incomplete white collar three to five scales wide, extending somewhat obliquely from just ahead of the forearm upward to the scapular region; the collar is edged on both sides by dark brown. The head is reddish and the chin and infralabial region scarlet red. The gular area is dark grayish-brown, the chest is pale chrome orange, and the belly is dirty white. Adult females are essentially the same color, lacking the scarlet red in the infralabial region, and the belly is yellow.

Behavior
M. groi lives in burrows it excavates itself, especially under fallen logs.

Reproduction
M. groi is oviparous.

See also
List of lizards of Colombia

References

Further reading
, Vladimir; Renjifo, Juan Manuel; Ayala, Stephen C. (1985). "Discovery of Morunasaurus groi Dunn (Sauria, Iguanidae) in Northwestern Colombia". Journal of Herpetology 19 (1): 162–164. 
Dunn ER (1933). "Amphibians and Reptiles from El Valle de Anton, Panama". Occ. Pap. Boston Soc. Nat. Hist. 8: 65–79. (Morunasaurus, new genus, pp. 75–76; Morunasaurus groi, new species, pp. 76–77).

Morunasaurus
Lizards of South America
Reptiles of Colombia
Reptiles of Panama
Reptiles described in 1933
Taxa named by Emmett Reid Dunn